Terminal Skypark Komuter station is a newly completed KTM Komuter limited express station located in Subang, Selangor, Malaysia. It was opened on 1 May 2018.

The station serves the Subang Skypark Terminal (Terminal 3) of the Sultan Abdul Aziz Shah Airport, providing the airport with a rail connection to Kuala Lumpur and the rest of Klang Valley.

Location
The station is located immediately across the Subang Airport Highway from Subang Skypark. An open-air car park sits directly in front of the station. Passengers going from the airport building to the station were required to cross a pedestrian bridge and walk through a portion of the car park.

Layout
In contrast to most KTM Komuter stations which are on ground level, Terminal Skypark station is elevated; the ticketing counter and control facilities are on ground level but the train platforms are one floor above ground. This, as well as the Sungai Gadut station, are the only 2 elevated stations in the Komuter system.

Toilets and a surau are available on the ground floor.

The station has two side platforms along two railway tracks. Platform 1 is for trains terminating at the station, while Platform 2 is for trains heading towards Subang Jaya and KL Sentral.

Feeder buses

Since 9 June 2022 buses now stop in front of the station entrance.

Gallery

Station

Skypark Terminal linkway

References

Petaling District
Railway stations in Selangor
Port Klang Line
Railway stations opened in 2018
Airport railway stations in Malaysia